Norman Birnbaum (July 21, 1926 – January 4, 2019) was an American sociologist.  He was an emeritus professor at the Georgetown University Law Center, and a member of the editorial board of The Nation.

Early life 
He was educated in New York City's public schools, at Williams College, and has a doctorate in sociology from Harvard University. He  taught at the London School of Economics and Political Science, Oxford University, the University of Strasbourg, Amherst College, served on the Graduate Faculty of the New School for Social Research and was Distinguished Fulbright Professor at the University of Bologna.

Birnbaum's pedagogical work included the introduction of sociology to the undergraduate curricula at Amherst and Oxford. A founding member of the editorial board of New Left Review, was active in politics on both sides of the Atlantic He had been an advisor to American trade unions and members of Congress, as well as to a number of social movements and political parties in Europe. He contributed regularly to a number of publications, including openDemocracy, El País in Spain, and the German daily Die Tageszeitung. His memoir was published in 2018.

Bibliography

Books
 
 (With Gertrud Lenzer), Sociology and Religion, 1969.
 Toward a critical sociology, 1971
 (Edited) Beyond The Crisis, 1976.
 Social Structure and The German Reformation, 1980.
 The Radical Renewal: The Politics Of Ideas In Modern America, 1988.
 Searching For The Light: Essays On Thought And Culture, 1993.
 After Progress: American Social Reform And European Socialism In The Twentieth Century, 2001.

Letters to the editor

References

External links
 The Nation profile
 Memoir, From the Bronx to Oxford and Not Quite Back
 Dissent review of his memoir
Contributions to The New York Review of Books

American sociologists
20th-century American Jews
Jewish sociologists
Williams College alumni
Harvard Graduate School of Arts and Sciences alumni
Georgetown University Law Center faculty
1926 births
2019 deaths
Fellows of Nuffield College, Oxford
Commanders Crosses of the Order of Merit of the Federal Republic of Germany
21st-century American Jews